Pietro Fiordelli (9 January 1916 – 23 December 2004) was an Italian Roman Catholic bishop, first residential bishop of Prato.

Biography 

Fiordelli was born in Città di Castello on 1916, he had a brother named Furio and three sisters, Gina, Maria and Dina. Ordained priest on November 6, 1938 and graduated at Pontifical Lateran University. After 16 years of ministry in Città di Castello, on 7 July 1954 he was appointed bishop of Prato by pope Pius XII; on following 3 October he was consecrated by bishop Filippo Maria Cipriani, being the youngest Italian bishop of the time.

Fiordelli held the office of bishop for 37 years, welcoming pope John Paul II on March 19, 1986 on a visit to Prato. On December 7, 1991, he left the office for having reached the age limit. He died, after a long illness, on the morning of December 23, 2004.

Controversial 

Monsignor Fiordelli was known in 1958 for having defined the Bellandi family (Mauro Bellandi and Loriana Nunziati) public sinners, a couple of citizens of Prato who had married in a civil ceremony. Fiordelli was tried for defamation: he was sentenced in the first instance to pay a fine of 40.000 liras, and acquitted on appeal for the "unquestionable act".

References

Sources 
 Official website of the Diocese of Prato 
  - Clipping from Newspapers.com

1916 births
2004 deaths
People from Città di Castello
20th-century Italian Roman Catholic bishops
21st-century Italian Roman Catholic bishops